Two Japanese destroyers have been named Matsukaze :

 , a  launched in 1906 and scrapped in 1928
 , a  launched in 1923 and sunk in 1944

Japanese Navy ship names
Imperial Japanese Navy ship names